Black Hawk (sometimes Blackhawk) is an unincorporated census-designated place (CDP) in Meade County, South Dakota, United States. The population was 3,026 at the 2020 census. Black Hawk has been assigned the ZIP code of 57718. Located along Interstate 90, Black Hawk is part of the Rapid City metropolitan area.

History
Black Hawk was platted in 1887. It took its name from a nearby creek which was named for Black Hawk, a Sauk chief. In May 2020, Black Hawk experienced a large sinkhole into an abandoned gypsum mine which displaced some twelve families.

Geography
Black Hawk is located at  (44.151575, -103.311420).

Black Hawk is located north of Box Elder Creek, west of Interstate 90, south of the City of Summerset, and east of the Black Hills National Forest.

Demographics

At the 2000 census there were 2,432 people in 847 households, including 665 families, in the CDP.  The population density was 1,119.8 people per square mile (432.7/km).  There were 871 housing units at an average density of 401.1 per square mile (155.0/km).  The racial makeup of the CDP was 94.86% White, 0.29% African American, 2.75% Native American, 0.21% Asian, 0.04% Pacific Islander, 0.04% from other races, and 1.81% from two or more races.  Hispanic or Latino of any race were 1.60%.

Of the 847 households 46.9% had children under the age of 18 living with them, 61.3% were married couples living together, 12.8% had a female householder with no husband present, and 21.4% were non-families. 15.3% of households were one person and 3.3% were one person aged 65 or older.  The average household size was 2.87 and the average family size was 3.17.

The age distribution was 32.4% under the age of 18, 8.0% from 18 to 24, 34.5% from 25 to 44, 19.8% from 45 to 64, and 5.3% 65 or older.  The median age was 32 years.  For every 100 females, there were 97.7 males. For every 100 females age 18 and over, there were 94.6 males.

The median household income was $44,414 and the median family income was $47,154.  Males had a median income of $34,135 versus $24,444 for females.  The per capita income for the CDP was $17,364.  About 10.1% of families and 12.2% of the population were below the poverty line, including 22.0% of those under age 18 and 4.5% of those age 65 or over.

Schools

Black Hawk is home to one elementary school, the current building was built in 1984 to house the expanding population. Black Hawk Elementary is included in the Rapid City School District.

References

Census-designated places in Meade County, South Dakota
Census-designated places in South Dakota
Rapid City, South Dakota metropolitan area